Bat Out of Hell is a British Thriller television serial created by Francis Durbridge and originally aired on BBC Two from 26 November to 24 December 1966. The series followed two lovers, Diana Stewart (Sylvia Syms) and Mark Paxton (John Thaw), who are haunted by the voice of Diana's husband over the telephone after he is murdered by the couple. Inspector Clay (Dudley Foster) was the detective inspector who headed the police investigation.

Situation 
Diana Stewart (Sylvia Syms) and Mark Paxton (John Thaw), are in love, however, Diana's husband Geoffrey (Noel Johnson) is unlikely to grant her a divorce. When it is discovered that Geoffrey has a mistress, the two begin planning his murder. One night, as he is preparing to go on a month-long holiday, Diana shoots her husband and Mark arrives shortly afterward to help her get rid of Geoffrey's body. Things start to go wrong when the body disappears from the house and Diana later receives a mysterious telephone call from her "deceased" husband. Diana is told by Geoffrey to meet him at a local hotel or he will go to the police and have her arrested for attempted murder.

Much to Mark's dismay, she is told to come to the hotel alone. Mark soon receives a phone call from a local shopkeeper, Kitty Tracey (Patsy Smart), who informs him that Diana has been arrested at the hotel after the police discovered Geoffrey's body. This is not the case, and the couple believe they are "home and dry" until they are preyed upon by a mysterious blackmailer.

Main characters 
Geoffrey Stewart (Noel Johnson) — a wealthy Sussex estate agent
Diana Stewart (Sylvia Syms) — the wife of Geoffrey
Mark Paxton (John Thaw) — the lover of Diana
Inspector Clay (Dudley Foster) — a "deceptively easy-going" police detective investigating Geoffrey's disappearance

Episodes

Reception 
Bat Out of Hell was first broadcast on 26 November 1966. It aired Saturday nights at 10:05 pm and ran for five episodes with the series finale on 24 December 1966. The serial provided an interesting premise with the story taking place before the actual murder, a rarity in the genre at the time, so that the motives for Diana Stewart and Mark Paxton decision to murder Geoffrey Stewart could be better understood by the audience. The series climax, according to the John Thaw Foundation, is "particularly well remembered" in British television history.

A novelisation of a five-part serial, entitled Bat Out of Hell: An Inspector Clay Mystery, was written by Francis Durbridge and published in 1972. British crime novelist Martin Edwards, who enjoyed the series as a child, praised the book as "a little-known gem of suspense".

References

External links 

1960s British drama television series
1966 British television series debuts
1966 British television series endings
1960s British television miniseries
1960s British mystery television series
BBC television dramas
Black-and-white British television shows
British detective television series
British thriller television series
English-language television shows
Mariticide in fiction
Adultery in television